Maiden Creek is an unincorporated community in Maidencreek Township in Berks County, Pennsylvania, United States. Maiden Creek is located at the intersection of U.S. Route 222 and Pennsylvania Route 73.

References

Unincorporated communities in Berks County, Pennsylvania
Unincorporated communities in Pennsylvania